Handball has been included at three editions of the Goodwill Games. It was first held for both men and women in 1986.

Two other editions have been held in 1990 and 1994, but only for men.

Men's tournament

 A round-robin tournament determined the final standings.

Women's tournament

 A round-robin tournament determined the final standings.

Medal table

References

External links
 
 
 

Sports at the Goodwill Games
Goodwill Games